Mackenzie Holmes is an American college basketball player for the Indiana Hoosiers of the Big Ten Conference.

High school career
Holmes played basketball for Gorham High School in Gorham, Maine. She won state titles in each of her first two years. As a senior, Holmes averaged 30.1 points, 16.7 rebounds and 3.9 blocks per game, and was named Maine Gatorade Player of the Year. She was a three-time Southwestern Maine Activities Association Player of the Year. Holmes left as her school's all-time leader in points, rebounds and blocks. Rated a five-star recruit by ESPN, she committed to playing college basketball for Indiana over offers from Iowa State, Boston College, Belmont and James Madison.

College career
As a freshman at Indiana, Holmes averaged 10.8 points and 5.2 rebounds per game, making the Big Ten All-Freshman Team. She set the program record for field goal percentage (63.4).

Holmes entered a starting role in her sophomore season. She averaged 17.8 points and 7.6 rebounds while leading the Big Ten with three blocks per game. Holmes was named first-team All-Big Ten, made the media All-Defensive Team and became the first player in program history to earn Associated Press All-American honorable mention.

As a junior, she averaged 15.2 points and seven rebounds per game, earning second-team All-Big Ten recognition. On December 29, 2022, Holmes posted a career-high 32 points and 12 rebounds in an 83–78 loss to Michigan State.

As a senior, Holmes averaged 22.5 points, 7.4 rebounds 1.1 steals and 1.9 blocks per game. She was named Big Ten Defensive Player of the Year and collected her second All-Big Ten honorable mention from the media.

References

External links
Indiana Hoosiers bio

Living people
American women's basketball players
Basketball players from Maine
People from Gorham, Maine
Indiana Hoosiers women's basketball players
Forwards (basketball)
Gorham High School (Maine) alumni
Year of birth missing (living people)
All-American college women's basketball players